PSKS Krakatau Steel Cilegon is an Indonesian football club based in Cilegon, Banten. PSKS stand for Persatuan Sepakbola Krakatau Steel (English: Football Association of Krakatau Steel).

Squad (2008–09)

Supporter 
 Steelman
Steelman (singkatan dari Krakatau Steel Mania) is Supporter of PSKS Krakatau steel.
 K-Man
K-MAN (Fullname: Krakatau Mania) is Supporter of PSKS Krakatau steel.

Kit suppliers
 Vilour (2009–2010)

References

External links
PSKS Krakatau Steel Liga-Indonesia.co.id

 
Football clubs in Banten
Association football clubs established in 1970
1970 establishments in Indonesia
Works association football clubs in Indonesia